Samuel Stevens Sands I (November 18, 1827 – July 24, 1892) was an American banker who served as the head of S.S. Sands & Co.

Early life
Sands was born at 112 Chambers Street in New York City on November 18, 1827.  He was the son of Austin Ledyard Sands (1779–1859), a merchant in New York City, and Anne Maria (née Hodge) Sands (1794–1876).  Among his siblings was brother Austin Ledyard Sands Jr. (1825–1877).

His paternal grandparents were Richardson Sands (1754–1783) and Lucretia (née Ledyard) Sands (1756–1846). After his grandfather's death, his grandmother married Ebenezer Stevens (1751–1823), a Lt. Col. in the Continental Army during the American Revolution, a Maj. Gen. in the New York State Militia, and a merchant.  She then became the mother of banker John Austin Stevens (1795–1874) and surgeon Alexander Hodgdon Stevens.

He was a graduate of the University of the City of New York with the Class of 1846.

Career
In 1854, he became a member of the New York Stock Exchange.  He was a banker and broker in partnership with William Henry Reese.  He acted as broker for a number of important financial interests, including the Astor family.  For many years, he was the president of S.S. Sands & Co.  He have several partners throughout his career, including his brother, William Richardson Sands, his brother-in-law, Edmund Brandt Aymar, William Henry Reese, and his sons Samuel Jr. and Charles.

Towards the end of his career, he became involved in the railroad business, financing Boston and New York Air-Line Railroad, the Indianapolis, Decatur & Springfield Railway, the Milwaukee Railroad, the Lakeshore and Western Railway and the Colorado Midland Railway.

Country home
In 1865, Sands built "Elmhurst" at New Hamburg, New York, a small hamlet along the Hudson River in Dutchess County, New York.

Personal life
On June 14, 1849, Sands was married to Eliza Dickson Aymar (1821–1850), the daughter of Benjamin Aymar, also a merchant, and Elizabeth (née Van Buren) Aymar.  After her death, he married her sister, Mary Ellis Aymar (1828–1879) on April 15, 1852.  Their elder sister was married to John D. Van Buren Jr., the New York State Engineer and Surveyor. After his marriage he lived at 80 Fifth Avenue in New York City and, later, at 385 Fifth Avenue.  Together, they were the parents of:

 Benjamin Aymar Sands (1853–1917), who married Amy Kirby Akin, the daughter of William H. Akin.
 Ledyard Sands (1854–1897), who married Sarah F. Thornton and died in Sri Lanka.
 Samuel Stevens Sands II (1856–1889), who married Anne Harriman (1861–1940), the daughter of banker Oliver Harriman and Laura (née Low) Harriman.  He died from a fall during a hunt at Meadow Brook in 1889.  After his death, his widow remarried first to Lewis Morris Rutherfurd Jr., and after his death, William Kissam Vanderbilt in 1903.
 Eliza Louise Sands (1858–1934), who was involved in the Social Service Committee of the Volunteer Hospital and did not marry.
 Mary Emily Sands (1859–1863), who died young.
 William Henry Sands (1861–1920), who married Frances Augusta Lorillard (8 AUG 1864–30 JAN 1931), daughter of Jacob Lorillard and granddaughter of Pierre Lorillard III.
 Anna Sands (1864–1932), a social leader in New York City and Newport, Rhode Island who did not marry.
 Charles Edward Sands (1865–1945), an Olympic tennis player who married Sarah Wilson Simonton in 1920.
 Robert Cornell Sands (1867–1932), who did not marry.
 Harold Cater Sands (1869–1881), who also died young.
 Katharine Aymar Sands (1871–1951), who married Theodore Augustus Havemeyer, Jr. (1868–1936), son of Theodore Havemeyer, in 1893.

He died on July 26, 1892 at his country home, "Elmhurst", near New Hamburg, New York.  He was buried at Greenwood Cemetery, in Brooklyn.

Descendants
Through his son Samuel, he was the grandfather of George Winthrop Sands (1885–1908), who was married to Tayo Newton, daughter of Dr. B. Newton of New York, in 1905, and Samuel Stevens Sands III (1884–1913), who married Gertrude Sheldon, daughter of George R. Sheldon, in 1910.

References

External links
 
 Photograph of his daughter, Anna Sands, in 1913 at the Library of Congress

1827 births
1892 deaths
New York Stock Exchange people
People from Greenwich Village
People from Midtown Manhattan
Burials at Green-Wood Cemetery